Den gyldene freden (The Golden Peace) is a restaurant in the Gamla stan section of Stockholm, Sweden.

Description
"Freden" ( The Peace), as it is locally called, received its name from the Peace of Nystad (1721) in which Russia won the most provinces but, strangely and luckily (hence "golden"), let Sweden keep Finland.
One of Sweden's most well-known restaurants, it is the second oldest restaurant in the world to have the same surroundings, according to the Guinness World Records. Its surroundings and environment are more or less unchanged since the day the restaurant opened in 1722, making it a unique example of an 18th-century tavern.

Throughout the centuries, Freden has been a central gathering place for many of Sweden's noted writers, painters and songwriters; most significantly, Anders Zorn bought Freden in 1919 and saved it from shutting down. The house in which Freden is located is now owned and so secured for the future by the Swedish Academy. Every Thursday, the Academy (which nominate the winner of the Nobel Prize in Literature) convenes here for its weekly dinner. The restaurant initially gained its reputation and fame through songs written by national poets Carl Michael Bellman (1740–1795), Evert Taube (1890–1976) and more recently by singer-songwriter Cornelis Vreeswijk (1937–1987).

See also
Gamla stan
Swedish Academy

References

Other sources
Arvidsson, Gösta; Melander Lars (2017)  Vi ses på Freden! : en berättelse om Gyldene Fredens historia (Stockholm: Carlssons)

External links
 website

1722 establishments in Sweden
Restaurants in Stockholm
Anders Zorn